Mount Tilley is a  mountain summit located  in the Gold Range of  the Monashee Mountains in British Columbia, Canada. Situated west of the Columbia River and Upper Arrow Lake, this peak is visible from the Trans-Canada Highway, Revelstoke, and Revelstoke Mountain Resort ski area. Its nearest higher peak is Mount Begbie,  to the east, with Tilley Lake set in the saddle between the two peaks.

History
Mount Tilley was named for Sir Samuel Leonard Tilley (1818–1896), a Canadian politician and one of the Fathers of Confederation. The mountain's name was officially adopted in 1924 by the Geographical Names Board of Canada, although this toponym had appeared in publications as early as 1887, if not earlier. The first ascent of the mountain was made in 1968 by Bruce Haggerstone and David P. Jones.

Climate
Based on the Köppen climate classification, Mount Tilley is located in a subarctic climate zone with cold, snowy winters, and mild summers. Precipitation runoff from Mount Tilley drains north into Begbie Creek, a tributary of the Columbia River, or southwest into Wap Creek, a tributary of the Eagle River, which in turn is a tributary of the Fraser River.

References

External links
 Weather: Mount Tilley
 Mt. Tilley photo: Flickr

Two-thousanders of British Columbia
Monashee Mountains
Kootenay Land District